Wolverine Peak is a  mountain summit located in the western Chugach Mountains, in Anchorage Municipality, in the U.S. state of Alaska. It is a prominent mountain on the Anchorage skyline. This geographic feature was so-named in 1963 by members of the Mountaineering Club of Alaska who found wolverine tracks in the snow near the summit. The name was officially adopted in 1964 by the U.S. Board on Geographic Names. A popular hike on a five-mile trail leads to the summit with views of Mount Williwaw, Denali, Mount Foraker, Cook Inlet, and Anchorage.

Climate

Based on the Köppen climate classification, Wolverine Peak is located in a subarctic climate zone with long, cold, snowy winters, and mild summers. Temperatures can drop below −20 °C with wind chill factors below −30 °C. Precipitation runoff from the peak drains into Campbell Creek, which empties into Turnagain Arm.

See also

List of mountain peaks of Alaska
Geology of Alaska

References

External links
 Weather forecast: Wolverine Peak
 Climbing information: Winterbear.com

Mountains of Alaska
Mountains of Anchorage, Alaska
North American 1000 m summits